Heteractaea is a genus of crabs in the family Xanthidae, containing the following species:

 Heteractaea ceratopus (Stimpson, 1860)
 Heteractaea lunata (Lucas, 1844)
 Heteractaea peterseni Garth, 1940

References

Xanthoidea